The  were held at Nagai Stadium in Osaka. Organised by JAAF, the three-day competition took place from June 8–10 and served as the national championships in track and field for the Japan. The competition was for the qualifying trial for the Japan team at the 2012 Summer Olympics. 

During the competition, 2 new national records and 4 new championship records were set in the events. Two women athletes, Tomomi Abiko set a new Japanese record in the pole vault, and Yuki Ebihara broke her own national record in the javelin. Koji Murofushi won the hummer throw's national champions for eighteen consecutive years. Yuzo Kanemaru won 400m eight years in a row. Chisato Fukushima won both the 100 m and 200m races two years in a row. For the Most Valuable Player of the Championships, Genki Dean and Yuki Ebihara were selected.

The competition was broadcast on television by NHK.

Ground conditions

Event schedule

Medal summary

Men

Women

Official Sponsor 
 Yamazaki Baking (Special Sponsor)
 ASICS
 Nike
 Otsuka Pharmaceutical
 Japan Airlines
 Nishi Sports
 Cerespo
 Osaka Gas (Special Offer)

References

Event Schedule and Results
 . Osaka Athletics Association. Retrieved 11 June 2012.
 . Osaka Athletics Association. Retrieved 11 June 2012.
 . Osaka Athletics Association. Retrieved 11 June 2012.
 . Osaka Athletics Association. Retrieved 11 June 2012.
 . Osaka Athletics Association. Retrieved 11 June 2012.
 . Osaka Athletics Association. Retrieved 11 June 2012.
 . Osaka Athletics Association. Retrieved 11 June 2012.
 . Osaka Athletics Association. Retrieved 11 June 2012.
 . Osaka Athletics Association. Retrieved 11 June 2012.
 . Osaka Athletics Association. Retrieved 11 June 2012.
 . Osaka Athletics Association. Retrieved 11 June 2012.
 . Osaka Athletics Association. Retrieved 11 June 2012.
 . Osaka Athletics Association. Retrieved 11 June 2012.
 . Osaka Athletics Association. Retrieved 11 June 2012.
 . Osaka Athletics Association. Retrieved 11 June 2012.
 . Osaka Athletics Association. Retrieved 11 June 2012.
 . Osaka Athletics Association. Retrieved 11 June 2012.
 . Osaka Athletics Association. Retrieved 11 June 2012.
 . Osaka Athletics Association. Retrieved 11 June 2012.
 . Osaka Athletics Association. Retrieved 11 June 2012.
 . Osaka Athletics Association. Retrieved 11 June 2012.
 . Osaka Athletics Association. Retrieved 11 June 2012.
 . Osaka Athletics Association. Retrieved 11 June 2012.
 . Osaka Athletics Association. Retrieved 11 June 2012.
 . Osaka Athletics Association. Retrieved 11 June 2012.
 . Osaka Athletics Association. Retrieved 11 June 2012.
 . Osaka Athletics Association. Retrieved 11 June 2012.
 . Osaka Athletics Association. Retrieved 11 June 2012.
 . Osaka Athletics Association. Retrieved 11 June 2012.
 . Osaka Athletics Association. Retrieved 11 June 2012.
 . Osaka Athletics Association. Retrieved 11 June 2012.
 . Osaka Athletics Association. Retrieved 11 June 2012.
 . Osaka Athletics Association. Retrieved 11 June 2012.
 . Osaka Athletics Association. Retrieved 11 June 2012.
 . Osaka Athletics Association. Retrieved 11 June 2012.
 . Osaka Athletics Association. Retrieved 11 June 2012.

External links

Official webpage at JAAF

Japan Championships in Athletics
Japan Outdoors
Track, Outdoor